is the pen name of a Japanese manga artist. Koikeda graduated with a degree in art from the Kyoto City University of Arts. In addition to her work in manga, she is a part-time lecturer at a vocational school.

Koikeda won the first Hairdressing Scissors-chan Grand Prize presented by the Japan National Hairdressing Trade Association for her manga Barber Harbor.

Works
Okaeri Mā-san (1991-1998, 3 volumes, Manga Home, Manga Time, Manga Time Jumbo, Hōbunsha)
Boku no Kawaii Jōshi-sama (1995-1999, 4 volumes, Hōbunsha, also published as 2 volume kanzenban by Futabasha)
Urara kana Hibi (1997, 1 volume, Hōbunsha)
Super Tumtum (1997-1998, 3 volumes, Hōbunsha, also published as 1 volume wideban by Kodansha)
Reiko ga Iku! (1998-1999, 2 volumes, Hōbunsha)
Tokimeki Makkun! (1996-1999, 3 volumes, Hōbunsha)
Saint Kōkōsei (1998-2007 (currently on hiatus), 9 volumes (as of January 2009), Shōnengahosha
Batsuichi 30ans (1999-2000, 2 volumes, Takeshobō)
...Sugi na Revolution (1999-2003, 8 volumes (republished as 3 volumes), Kodansha)
My Pace! Yuzuran (1999-2004, 5 volumes, Futabasha)
Aoi-sama ga Suki (2000, published in the same volume as Hinotama Love, Futabasha)
Barber Harbor (2001-2005, 7 volumes, Kodansha)
Ichigo Office (2002, 4 volumes, Daitosha)
CGH! Cactus, Go to Heaven! (2005-2008, 5 volumes, Shodensha)
Hinotama Love (2006-2007, 1 volume, Manga Action, Futabasha)
Umeboshi (2006-2008, 2 volumes, Young Gangan, Square Enix)
Barber Harbor NG (2007, 1 volume, Kodansha)
Mermaid Blues (2007, 1 volume, Takeshobō)
Fushigi-kun Jam (2008-current, 1 volume as of January 2009, Futabasha)
TOMOS! Cole train no isan (2011-current, 2 volumes as of February 2011, Futabasha)

References

1969 births
Kyoto City University of Arts alumni
Living people
Manga artists from Yamaguchi Prefecture